Evi Edna Ogholi (born 6 July 1966). is a Nigerian female reggae musician popular for her song "Happy Birthday".

Early life
Ogholi was born on 6 July 1966 birthday in Isoko, Delta State (then Midwest Region) to the household of Reverend R. O. Ogholirly. She married her producer and manager Emma Ogosi, and they had two children. The couple later separated and Ogholi is living in Paris.

Career
Ogholi released her debut album My Kind of Music in 1987. Emma Ogosi was her manager and producer. Her popular hits are "Happy Birthday" "Oghene Me" and "Look Before You Cross". After a long vacation from the music scene Ogholi unveiled her plans to resume to entertain her fans, during her interview with BBC Pidgin and Splash 105.5 FM Ibadan.

APCN Humanitarian Awards
In 2020, she was honored and endorsed as the brand Ambassador of Hope and Peace to Aid People Change Nigeria Charity and Orphanage Organisation in Nigeria and Ireland to host Nigeria and Ireland largest humanitarian 12th edition award event.

Other names
Ogholi earned the recognition 'Queen of Nigeria reggae' firstly from a Nigerian reggae music legend blessed memory of Majek Fashek to later be known globally with her act. She told BBC Pidgin during her interview that her reggae wristband was a gift from Majek Fashek to her, after they finished recording with their band in a studio section in Lagos. She was later known for other names like 'Africa's Queen Of Reggae', a nickname she earned from fans in west Africa, after she released three albums that went Platinum album.

Endorsement
Ogholi was an ambassador for Pepsi in 1990, and featured in a commercial for the brand with Yvonne Chaka Chaka, Charly Boy, and Femi Kuti.

Controversy
After Ogholi left the Nigerian music scene in 1990 she volunteered for Unicef in France for almost nineteen years. Rumors circulated on Instagram, Facebook and blogs that she had died were dispelled in 2020 and Nigerian national journalists contacted her for a press release.

Record deal
In 2020 she signinged a five-year record deal with Enorecords owned by Nigeria reggae singer Winning Jah. In August 2020, she released an EP under the imprint, titled Peace and Love which included a remix of her most popular song 'Happy Birthday'. The EP was produced, mixed and mastered by the label's in-house producer Ayemere Joshua, commonly known by his stage name 'Jossy Joe'.

Discography
 My Kind Of Music (LP, Album) 	Polydor 	POLP 157 	1987
 On The Move Polydor 		        1988
 Happy Birthday (LP, Album) 	Polydor 	POLP 197 	1988
 No Place Like Home              Polydor 		        1989
Loose (LP, Album) 	Margenta (2) 	MGTLP 001 	1990
 Step By Step (LP, Album) 	Polydor 	POLP 247 	1990
 Peace and Love (LP,Album)       Enorecords LLC                  2020

See also
 Ras Kimono
 Majek Fashek

References

1970 births
Living people
20th-century Nigerian women singers
Musicians from Delta State
Nigerian reggae musicians
21st-century Nigerian women singers